Breedon Group plc (formerly Ennstone plc) is an AIM-listed British construction materials company headquartered at Breedon on the Hill, Leicestershire, England. In 2016 Breedon became the UK's largest independent construction materials firm following its acquisition of Hope Construction Materials and in 2018 extended its operations into Ireland with the acquisition of Lagan Group.

Breedon has nearly 3000 employees and operates from around 300 sites. The business turned over £862m in the year to December 2018, with a market capitalisation of more than £1bn. Breedon Group produces cement, construction aggregates, asphalt, ready-mixed concrete, bitumen and other construction materials. It also has a sizeable contract surfacing and highway maintenance business.

The company was founded in 2008 by Peter Tom, chairman of the Leicester Tigers rugby club, and Simon Vivian. The current chairman is Amit Bhatia, son-in-law of Lakshmi Mittal, the billionaire steel magnate who became a Breedon shareholder following the Hope acquisition.

History
Breedon's HQ is located in the village and parish of Breedon on the Hill, where stone has been quarried since the late 1800s. In 2000, Breedon and its Breedon Hill and Cloud Hill quarries were acquired by Ennstone, a Midlands-based aggregates group. The Ennstone businesses were acquired by Breedon Aggregates Limited in 2010. These acquisitions took place under Breedon's former executive chairman, Peter Tom, and then CEO Simon Vivian, who stepped down in 2015. Their strategy was to grow the company via the acquisition of small, often family-owned operations, in an industry generally regarded as having high barriers to entry.

In 2016 the company was renamed Breedon Group after completing its £336m acquisition of Hope Construction Materials, its largest purchase to date.

In January 2020, Breedon agreed a £178m deal with Cemex to take over 49 ready-mix plants, 28 aggregate quarries, four depots, one cement terminal, 14 asphalt plants and four concrete products operations. However, the deal was suspended pending a regulatory investigation ordered by the UK's Competition and Markets Authority.

Operations
Breedon Group operates as five autonomous businesses:  Breedon Southern, Breedon Northern, Whitemountain (NI), Lagan (RoI) and Breedon Cement. Breedon Southern, Breedon Northern, Whitemountain and Lagan are vertically integrated aggregates businesses, operating quarries, ready-mixed concrete and asphalt plants, contract surfacing & highway maintenance operations. Breedon Cement produces cement at two plants at Hope in Derbyshire and Kinnegad in the Republic of Ireland, and also imports/exports cementitious materials through three UK terminals.

The firm has the reported capacity to produce around 2 million tonnes of cement each year. Breedon Cement operates four rail-linked depots, including a major facility in Dagenham, Essex, which produces bagged cement.

The group is reported to hold a total of approximately 900 million tonnes of natural mineral reserves and resources.

Breedon Group owns a 37.5% stake in BEAR Scotland, which maintains roads on behalf of Transport Scotland, and a majority stake in Alba Traffic Management, an Inverness-based firm that provides traffic management services for highway works, events and utilities. Through Mobile Concrete Solutions (MCS), Breedon also operates an on-site concrete batching service, run as a joint venture with construction services company TSL.

Products
Breedon produces a variety of grades of bulk and packed cement, in addition to crushed rock, sand, gravel, agricultural lime and a range of specialist ready-mixed concretes and asphalts. One of its best-known products is Golden Amber Gravel, used for pathways and driveways; it is reportedly the only gravel with a Royal Warrant. Golden Amber is used at Chatsworth House, The National War Memorial Arboretum and the Sandringham Estate.

Other products include speedway shale, which is a mix of crushed limestone and clay laid down to form the competitive surface at motorcycle speedway tracks. Breedon shale is used in international speedway tracks such as Cardiff, Gothenburg and Copenhagen. Breedon developed its shale product alongside former speedway World Champion Ole Olsen and his son Torben.

Recent acquisitions
In February 2016 the UK Government's Competition and Markets Authority (CMA) announced it would investigate the proposed acquisition of Hope Construction Materials by Breedon, citing a possible lessening of competition in the building materials industry. The subsequent investigation held that the acquisition would not unduly reduce competition for the production and supply of aggregates, but that there should be further investigation into the supply of ready-mixed concrete. In response to the CMA, Breedon offered to sell 14 concrete plants from a list of 27 sites that the CMA believed would have reduced competition. The CMA accepted Breedon's list of divestments and permitted the acquisition. Plants divested included sites at Cloddach, Moray and Inverness. The £336m cash-and-shares acquisition of Hope closed in August 2016.

In November 2016 Breedon acquired the Sherburn Minerals Group for a total consideration of up to £15.7 million.  Sherburn is a leading independent heavyside building materials business headquartered in County Durham, employing approximately 110 people. It operates four quarries and five ready-mixed concrete plants in County Durham, Northumberland, North Yorkshire and Cumbria. It also distributes cementitious products from two import terminals at Blyth near Newcastle and Dundee in eastern Scotland.

In May 2017 the group acquired Pro Mini Mix, a specialist concrete ‘mini mix’ supplier based at Oldbury and operating throughout the Midlands.  This was followed in August 2017 by the acquisition of Humberside Aggregates, an independent sand & gravel quarry and aggregates merchanting business based at North Cave near Hull in East Yorkshire, for a total consideration of £9.0 million.  Humberside's clients include ready-mixed concrete and mortar producers, various Government agencies, local authorities, and local and national building and civil engineering contractors.

In December 2017 Breedon announced its planned acquisition from Tarmac of four quarries and an asphalt plant for £16.5 million, to be satisfied by the transfer to Tarmac of 27 of its readymix plants and payment of £4.9m in cash. This transaction is expected to be completed at the end of June 2018.

In February 2018, Breedon was reported to be in talks to acquire a majority stake in the Lagan Group, a construction business covering quarrying, cement, asphalt and contracting.

In April 2018, it was announced that Lagan Group had been sold to Breedon for £455m.

In June 2018 the company acquired Blinkbonny Quarry in the Scottish Borders, adding nearly 3 million tonnes of hard rock to its reserves. In October 2019 it was announced that the company had purchased Roadway Surfacing & Civil Engineering Limited for up to £13.5 million, establishing it as a fully integrated business in North Wales

Financial performance
For the full financial year to December 2018, Breedon generated revenues of £862.7m, underlying EBIT of £103.5m and an underlying EBIT margin of 12%.

Breedon's stated strategy is to continue growing organically and through the acquisition of businesses in the UK heavyside construction materials market.

References 

Companies listed on the Alternative Investment Market
Companies based in Leicester
Wholesalers of the United Kingdom
Building materials companies of the United Kingdom
Quarrying
Construction industry of the United Kingdom
Construction and civil engineering companies of the United Kingdom
2008 establishments in England
British companies established in 2008
Construction and civil engineering companies established in 2008